NH 75 may refer to:

 National Highway 75 (India)
 New Hampshire Route 75, United States